The Imperial Dictionary of Universal Biography was a biographical dictionary of the nineteenth century, published by William Mackenzie in Glasgow.

The second edition, which was published in 1876, was released in two sets. One was a set of 28 volumes (parts), priced at 4 shillings each. The other set was in 14 volumes (divisions), in elegant cloth, bevel boards, cut edges, and priced at 10 shillings each.

Publication
The Dictionary was issued by part publication, and its first edition appeared from 1857 to 1863. In collected form (1863) there were three volumes, originally issued in 16 parts. A later edition appeared from 1876.

Staff and writers
The Imperial Dictionary was edited by John Francis Waller from 1857 to 1866; Patrick Edward Dove was general editor for the first 20 numbers, John Service was on the editorial staff 1858 to 1862, acting as sub-editor under Dove. Also involved editorially were William John Macquorn Rankine, Francis Bowen, John Eadie, and John Pringle Nichol.

A list of contributors appeared in the first volume, and a further list in volume II.

Other contributors included:

John Merry Ross,
Christina Rossetti on Petrarch, and numerous other Italians
William Michael Rossetti, 
Algernon Charles Swinburne,
 
There were engravings included by William Thomas Fry, James Thomson, and Richard Woodman.

Notes

External links
 Waller, John Francis; Eadie, John; editors (1863). The Imperial Dictionary of Universal Biography, 3 volumes. Glasgow: William MacKenzie. Vols. 1 (AA–CZU), 2 (DAA–IWA), and 3 (JAA–ZWI) at HathiTrust.

Biographical dictionaries
1863 non-fiction books
1876 non-fiction books